Aspilapteryx is a genus of moths in the family Gracillariidae.

Species
Aspilapteryx filifera (Meyrick, 1912)
Aspilapteryx grypota (Meyrick, 1914)
Aspilapteryx inquinata Triberti, 1985
Aspilapteryx limosella (Duponchel, 1843)
Aspilapteryx magna Triberti, 1985
Aspilapteryx multipunctella (Chrétien, 1917)
Aspilapteryx pentaplaca (Meyrick, 1911)
Aspilapteryx seriata (Meyrick, 1912)
Aspilapteryx spectabilis Huemer, 1994
Aspilapteryx tessellata (Turner, 1940)
Aspilapteryx tringipennella (Zeller, 1839)

External links
De Prins, J. & De Prins, W. 2019. Afromoths, online database of Afrotropical moth species (Lepidoptera). World Wide Web electronic publication (www.afromoths.net) (acc.:21.11.2020)

 
Gracillariinae
Gracillarioidea genera